Najljepše pjesme (trans. The most beautiful songs) is a compilation album of Dino Merlin with the Merlin band as well. This compilation album was released in 1995.

Track listing
Učini mi pravu stvar
Nešto lijepo treba da se desi
Moja bogda sna
Vojnik sreće
Zaboravi
Pala magla
Nek' padaju ćuskije
Danas sam OK
Kad zamirišu jorgovani
Kokuzna vremena
Bosnom behar probeharao
Mjesečina

External links
Najljepše pjesme on Dino Merlin's official web site

1995 greatest hits albums
Dino Merlin albums
Nimfa Sound albums